The Mighty Jungle is a sitcom that ran on the Family Channel during 1994. It starred Francis Guinan as Dan Winfield, a family man who is the only one who knows that the animals in his backyard zoo can speak. Voices included Tony Danza and Delta Burke.

Cast

Main
 Francis Guinan as Dan Winfield
 Charlene Fernetz as Susan Winfield
 Molly Atkinson as  Alison Winfield
 Noah Shebib as  Andrew Winfield
 Sylvie Loeillet as Sylvia
 Patrick McKenna as Kenneth Crisp

Recurring
 Delta Burke as the voice of Viola the toucan
 Tony Danza as the voice of Vinnie the alligator
 David Fowler as the voice of Winston the orangutan
 Clara Duverne as the puppeteer of Winston
 P.J. Heslin as the voice of Jack the sea lion

External links

1990s American sitcoms
1994 American television series debuts
1994 American television series endings
1990s Canadian sitcoms
1994 Canadian television series debuts
1994 Canadian television series endings
American television shows featuring puppetry
Canadian television shows featuring puppetry
Television series about families
Television series about birds
Television shows about apes
Television series by Alliance Atlantis
Television series by Sony Pictures Television
English-language television shows